The Apostate is a 2015 Uruguayan-Spanish drama film directed by Federico Veiroj, the plot follows a man pursuing apostasy from the Catholic Church.

Cast
 Álvaro Ogalla as Gonzalo
 Bárbara Lennie as Maite
 Marta Larralde as Pilar
 Vicky Peña as Madre
 Joaquín Climent as Padre

Release
The film was screened in the Contemporary World Cinema section of the 2015 Toronto International Film Festival, where it debuted on 11 September 2015.

Reception
The film has a score of 66% on Metacritic.

References

External links
 

2015 films
2015 drama films
2010s Spanish-language films
Spanish drama films
Uruguayan drama films
2010s Spanish films